Adam Michálek (born 8 April 1975) is a Czech rower. He competed at the 1996 Summer Olympics in Atlanta with the men's lightweight double sculls where they came 13th.

References

External links 
 

1975 births
Living people
Czech male rowers
Olympic rowers of the Czech Republic
Rowers at the 1996 Summer Olympics
Rowers at the 2004 Summer Olympics
People from Hodonín
Sportspeople from the South Moravian Region